Amatsukaze  was a  of the Imperial Japanese Navy.

Design and description
The Kagerō class was an enlarged and improved version of the preceding . Their crew numbered 240 officers and enlisted men. The ships had two Kampon geared steam turbines, each driving one propeller shaft, using steam provided by three Kampon water-tube boilers.

The main armament of the Kagerō class consisted of six Type 3  guns in three twin-gun turrets, one superfiring pair aft and one turret forward of the superstructure. They were built with four Type 96  anti-aircraft guns in two twin-gun mounts, but more of these guns were added over the course of the war. The ships were also armed with eight  torpedo tubes for the oxygen-fueled Type 93 "Long Lance" torpedo in two quadruple traversing mounts; one reload was carried for each tube. Their anti-submarine weapons comprised 16 depth charges.

Service history

During the first year of the Pacific War, the destroyer was under the command of Tameichi Hara and participated in the battles of the Java Sea, Eastern Solomons and the Santa Cruz Islands. During the Naval Battle of Guadalcanal Amatsukaze sank the destroyer  with two torpedoes and probably damaged  with a third, but injudicious use of her searchlights attracted the attention of the light cruiser . The ensuing barrage silenced Amatsukazes guns, knocked out her steering engine and killed 43 of her crew but her turbines were not affected and she was able to withdraw at  using emergency manual steering.

Amatsukaze was under repair at Kure Naval Arsenal until February 1943, and was then deployed to Truk, carrying out escort and transport operations until returning to Japan for refit at Kure in December that year.
 
On 11 January 1944, while escorting a convoy of four ships in the South China Sea, Amatsukaze was torpedoed by the submarine . The resulting magazine explosion severed the bow of the ship and killed 80 crewmen. Miraculously, the ship did not sink. Presumed sunk, the ship was not discovered for six days until she was spotted by a patrol plane. Amatsukaze was eventually towed to Singapore where a temporary bow was rigged.

She managed to shoot down two of her assailants, but was hit by one or two bombs. Her crew managed to beach the ship; salvage attempts were abandoned on 8 April. On 10 April, the ship was scuttled with explosive charges.

In 2012, the wreckage of Amatsukaze was found by a Chinese engineering ship. About 30 tons of the wreckage was salvaged, cut into pieces and sold as scrap metal before the intervention of local relics administration departments. According to Chinese media, a museum will be built to protect the remaining wreckage.

References

Bibliography

External links
 CombinedFleet.com: Kagero-class destroyers
 CombinedFleet.com: Amatsukaze history

Kagerō-class destroyers
World War II destroyers of Japan
World War II shipwrecks in the South China Sea
1939 ships
Maritime incidents in April 1945
Scuttled vessels
Ships built by Maizuru Naval Arsenal
2012 archaeological discoveries